Jermaine Reid (born April 19, 1983) is a professional Canadian football defensive tackle who is currently a free agent. He was traded to the Argonauts by the Edmonton Eskimos on March 22, 2013. He was drafted by the Tiger-Cats in the second round of the 2006 CFL Draft. He played college football for the Akron Zips.

References

External links
Toronto Argonauts bio

1983 births
Living people
Akron Zips football players
BC Lions players
Canadian football defensive linemen
Edmonton Elks players
Hamilton Tiger-Cats players
Players of Canadian football from Ontario
Canadian football people from Toronto
Toronto Argonauts players